Hazem Sannib (born September 16, 1976; Kuwait) is a Syrian painter and photographer of Lebanese descent. He is the creative director and founder of Sannib Arts and The Kavli Advertising Ltd in Kuwait. Sannib is known for creating the Dreamalism movement, a new art concept and contemporary paintings using oil and acrylic colors.

Life and work
Sannib is a Syrian contemporary artist of Lebanese descent who is currently living in London. Sannib started painting at the age of 10 with no prior lesson nor technique. From 1997 to 1998, he took his first figurative and abstract painting lessons with Syrian painter Fared Jorgeuos.  Sannib participated in his first art exhibition in 1994 in Kuwait and later with the Syrian Artist Group Exhibition in Homs, Syria in 1998. From 2001 to 2002, Sannib lived in London, U.K. where he took additional painting lessons and improved his technique and style. In 2006, he experimented with abstract themes and acrylic painting under the guidance of Mard Issa, a Norwegian classical painter and author who inspired him. Sannib's work focus on digital art, Islamic and Western art and around humanitarian and contemporary themes.  The concept of “Dreamalism” is his signature style and a movement he started in 2014. According to him, Dreamalism is for the preservation of the aspirations and dreams of people longing for liberation, prosperity, freedom of expression and speech. He is known for his paintings of God's names, the door of Kaaba and the golden Mecca. His most recent creation is a digital Islamic art that combines graphic design and fine art.

Selected exhibitions

References

External links 
  Sannib’s main website
  Sannib’s UK website

1976 births
Living people

Syrian contemporary artists
Syrian people of Lebanese descent